Te Whiti, formerly Te Whiti o Tu in the nineteenth century, is a rural community in the Wairarapa region of New Zealand's North Island.  Its status has been under dispute and threatened in the twentieth century, and Land Information New Zealand acknowledges Te Whiti solely as a homestead.  Its full former name means "the place of crossing" in the Māori language, reflecting its location near a natural crossing of the Ruamahanga River where it is met by the Waingawa River. The Ruamahunga River runs north and west of the locality and is also met by the Tauweru River that flows across the south of Te Whiti.  In relation to major Wairarapa centres, Te Whiti is south of Masterton and east of Carterton, while nearby communities include Te Whanga to the east and Gladstone and Longbush to the south.  The Maungaraki Range is also nearby.

Te Whiti is one of the oldest settled locations in the Wairarapa, established prior to Masterton by Hugh McKenzie in the early 1850s.  A primary school was located in Te Whiti until it was closed in 1968 and students sent to Gladstone; the school buildings remained for use by community groups until 2000.

References 

Populated places in the Wellington Region
Masterton District
Wairarapa